Jürgen Schlegel (born 3 October 1940) is a German boxer. He competed at the 1964 Summer Olympics and the 1968 Summer Olympics. At the 1964 Summer Olympics, he defeated Henry Mugwanya of Uganda before losing to Cosimo Pinto of Italy.

References

External links

 

1940 births
Living people
German male boxers
Olympic boxers of the United Team of Germany
Olympic boxers of East Germany
Boxers at the 1964 Summer Olympics
Boxers at the 1968 Summer Olympics
Sportspeople from Gdańsk
Light-heavyweight boxers